Psilostrophe cooperi is a flowering plant in the daisy family known by the common names Cooper's paper daisy and whitestem paperflower. It is native to the Mojave and Sonoran Deserts of California, the Southwestern United States, and northwestern Mexico.

Description
P. cooperi is perennial shrub with stems rising from a woody base to form that a nearly spherical form. It is a low, spreading bush with pale green, hairy foliage. It is drought deciduous, dropping its leaves in times of drought. The linear leaves are alternate.

The daisylike flower heads have 3 to 8 deeply toothed golden-yellow ray florets. The flower heads are often bunched together at the tops of the stems in a rounded spray. The ray flowers persist for a time and then dry and become papery while maintaining their yellow color. The 3 toothed corollas of the dried ray flowers fold back over the phyllaries.

Several related species are poisonous to livestock.

Distribution and habitat

References

External links
Jepson Manual Treatment - Psilostrophe cooperi'
USDA Plants Profile: Psilostrophe cooperi'
''Psilostrophe cooperi''' - Photo gallery

Helenieae
Flora of Northwestern Mexico
Flora of the Southwestern United States
Flora of the California desert regions
Flora of the Sonoran Deserts
Flora without expected TNC conservation status